The 24th Expeditionary Reconnaissance Squadron is a provisional unit of the United States Air Force. It is assigned to United States Air Forces Europe to activate or inactivate as needed.  Its last known attachment was to the 100th Air Refueling Wing, stationed at RAF Mildenhall, Suffolk, UK in 2007.

History

B-29 Superfortress operations against Japan

Constituted in spring 1944 as a B-29 Superfortress very heavy bombardment squadron.  When training was completed moved to North Field Tinianin the Mariana Islands of the Central Pacific Area in January 1945 and assigned to XXI Bomber Command, Twentieth Air Force. Its mission  was the strategic bombardment of the Japanese Home Islands and the destruction of its war-making capability.

Flew "shakedown" missions against Japanese targets on Moen Island, Truk, and other points in the Carolines and Marianas.  The squadron began combat missions over Japan on 25 February 1945 with a firebombing mission over Northeast Tokyo.  The squadron continued to participate in wide area firebombing attack, but the first ten-day blitz resulting in the Army Air Forces running out of incendiary bombs. Until then the squadron flew conventional strategic bombing missions using high explosive bombs.

The squadron continued attacking urban areas with incendiary raids until the end of the war in August 1945, attacking major Japanese cities, causing massive destruction of urbanized areas.  Also conducted raids against strategic objectives, bombing aircraft factories, chemical plants, oil refineries, and other targets in Japan. The squadron flew its last combat missions on 14 August when hostilities ended.  Afterwards, its B 29s carried relief supplies to Allied prisoner of war camps in Japan and Manchuria.

Squadron remained in Western Pacific, assigned to Twentieth Air Force on Okinawa.  Maintained as a strategic bombardment squadron until inactivated due to budget reductions in late 1948.   Some aircraft scrapped on Tinian; others flown to storage depots in the United States.

Strategic Air Command
Reactivated in 1951 and redesigned as a heavy bomb squadron, the unit was initially issued with B-29s for training. It was equipped with B-36 Peacemaker intercontinental strategic bombers in 1953 for operational use. It began with B-36Fs; the featherweight B-36J was added, the squadron operating both types. These aircraft carried a yellow stripe on the tip of the vertical stabilizer, the lip of the jet intakes and the "nose cone" of the jet itself along with an 'R' inside a triangle as a tail code. SAC (Strategic Air Command), eliminated tail codes in 1953. In 1957 the B-36s were replaced by B-52E Stratofortresses and all squadron markings were eliminated. The squadron remained equipped with the B-52s until the closure of Walker AFB in 1967.

It was re-equipped with RC-135 Cobra Ball/Cobra Eye aircraft to support theater and national level intelligence consumers with near real-time on-scene collection, analysis and dissemination capabilities. The squadron was inactivated as part of the post Cold War drawdown in 1994 and replaced by the 45th Reconnaissance Squadron.

Operations and decorations
 Combat Operations: Combat in Western Pacific, 27 Jan-14 Aug 1945.
 Campaigns: World War II: Eastern Mandates; Western Pacific; Air Offensive, Japan.
 Decorations: Distinguished Unit Citations: Tokyo, Japan, 25 May 1945; Japanese Empire, 9–19 Jul 1945. Air Force Outstanding Unit Award: 1 May 1960 – 31 May 1962.

Lineage
24th Bombardment Squadron
 Constituted as the 24th Bombardment Squadron, Very Heavy on 28 March 1944
 Activated on 1 April 1944
 Inactivated on 18 October 1948
 Redesignated the 24th Bombardment Squadron, Medium on 20 December 1950
 Activated on 2 January 1951
 Redesignated the 24th Bombardment Squadron, Heavy on 16 June 1952
 Inactivated and discontinued on 25 January 1967
 Consolidated with the 24th Strategic Reconnaissance Squadron on 19 September 1985 as the 24th Strategic Reconnaissance Squadron

24th Strategic Reconnaissance Squadron
 Constituted as 24th Strategic Reconnaissance Squadron on 20 December 1966
 Activated on 25 March 1967
 Consolidated with the 24th Bombardment Squadron, Medium on 19 September 1985
 Redesignated as 24th Reconnaissance Squadron on 7 July 1992
 Inactivated on 30 June 1994
 Redesignated 24th Expeditionary Reconnaissance Squadron on 2 July 2007
 Activated on 4 August 2007

Assignments
 6th Bombardment Group, 1 April 1944 – 18 October 1948; 2 January 1951
 6th Bombardment Wing(later Strategic Aerospace Wing), 16 June 1952 – 25 January 1967
 6th Strategic Wing (later 6th Strategic Reconnaissance Wing) 25 March 1967
 55th Operations Group, 7 July 1992 – 30 June 1994
 United States Air Forces Europe, 2 July 2007 to activate or inactivate as needed
 401st Air Expeditionary Group 4 August 2007
 100th Air Refueling Wing: attached 16 August 2007 – unknown

Stations

 Dalhart Army Air Field, Texas, 1 April 1944
 Grand Island Army Air Field, Nebraska, 26 May – 18 November 1944
 North Field, Tinian, 28 December 1944
 Clark Field, Luzon, Philippines, 13 March 1946

 Kadena AB, Okinawa, 1 June 1947 – 18 October 1948
 Walker AFB, New Mexico, 2 January 1951 – 25 January 1967
 Eielson AFB, Alaska 25 March 1967
 Offutt AFB, Nebraska, 7 July 1992 – 30 June 1994
 RAF Mildenhall, England, 4 August 2007 –

Aircraft

 B-17 Flying Fortress, 1944
 B-29 Superfortress, 1944–1947, 1951–1952
 RB-36 Peacemaker, 1953–1957

 B-52 Stratofortress, 1957–1967
 RC-135S Cobra Ball, 1967–1992

See also

 List of B-52 Units of the United States Air Force

References

Notes
 Explanatory notes

 Citations

Bibliography

External links
 "A Tale of Two Airplanes" by Kingdon R. "King" Hawes, Lt Col, USAF (Ret.)

Units and formations of Strategic Air Command
Military units and formations established in 1944
024